Pedro Paulo de Oliveira, best known as Pedrinho (born June 29, 1977 in Rio de Janeiro) is a Brazilian football pundit and retired footballer who played primarily as a left winger. Pedrinho, a left-footed midfielder, is known for his virtuous style, with his excellent dribbling skills, quickness, ball control, and flair for offensive plays.

Career
On 3 January 2008, Pedrinho signed a five-month contract with Al Ain, in which he played for the club until May 2008. On 2 September 2008, Pedrinho completed a move to Vasco da Gama. He signed on 21 January 2009 a contract with Figueirense.

On 7 August 2009, due to continuous knee injuries, he decided to retire, at age of 32. On 2011, he was invited by Olaria to come back from retirement and signed for the club to play the 2012 Campeonato Carioca. In 2013, Pedrinho retired definitively, playing a friendly match for Vasco da Gama against Ajax.

Honours

Vasco da Gama
Brazilian League: 1997, 2000
Libertadores Cup: 1998
Rio de Janeiro State League: 1998
Tournament Rio - São Paulo: 1999
Guanabara Cup: 2000
Mercosur Cup: 2000

Palmeiras
Brazilian League (2nd division): 2003

Santos
São Paulo State League: 2007

References

External links
 sambafoot

1977 births
Living people
Brazilian footballers
Brazilian expatriate footballers
Brazil international footballers
Brazil under-20 international footballers
Association football midfielders
CR Vasco da Gama players
Sociedade Esportiva Palmeiras players
Ittihad FC players
Fluminense FC players
Santos FC players
Al Ain FC players
Figueirense FC players
Olaria Atlético Clube players
Campeonato Brasileiro Série A players
Copa Libertadores-winning players
Expatriate footballers in the United Arab Emirates
Brazilian expatriate sportspeople in the United Arab Emirates
UAE Pro League players
Footballers from Rio de Janeiro (city)